Wang Rui (born April 18, 1978 in Hebei Province) is a Chinese chess Grandmaster.

National team
Wang has competed in the China national chess team in the Chess Olympiad once at the 33rd Chess Olympiad in 1998 (games played 3: +2, =0, -1), and once for the China "B" team at the Asian Team Chess Championships (1999) (games played 4: +1, =1, -2).

GM title
He gained his three GM norms to become China's 28th grandmaster:

 (Oct 2005) World Championship Zonal 3.5 China in Beijing; score 7.0/9
 (Nov 2006) 1st Gloria Macapagal Arroyo Cup Int Open in Manila; score 6.5/9
 (Dec 2008) KL Open Chess Championship in Kuala Lumpur; score 7.0/9

China Chess League
Wang Rui plays for Hebei chess club in the China Chess League (CCL).

See also
Chess in China

References

External links

Wang Rui at New In Chess

1978 births
Living people
Chess players from Hebei
Chess grandmasters
Chess Olympiad competitors
Sportspeople from Hebei